Mangrove snake may refer to:

 Boiga dendrophila, native to Asia
 Erythrolamprus cobella, native to South America
 Nerodia clarkii compressicauda, native to Florida
 Myron, a genus of marine snakes native to northern Australia, the Aru Islands and New Guinea